Platinum Pied Pipers is a Detroit-based hip hop and R&B group composed of producer Waajeed (Robert O'Bryant), and multi-instrumentalist Saadiq (Darnell Bolden, not to be confused with Raphael Saadiq).  Their music usually features a rotating and varied array of artists.

Background 
The two met through rapper Baatin in 1992.  Sometime in 2000, they decided to form a duo and began releasing 12"s and mixtapes.  It was their collaboration with Dwele in 2003, however, called "Ridin' High" which caught the ears of music listeners, and set the stage for a full-length album.  The pair have a rather distinctive mixture of sounds as, although Waajeed is primarily a hip hop producer, Saadiq is a protégé of Motown producer Barrett Strong, making for a finely tuned middleground.  As stated in interviews, the name "Platinum Pied Pipers" was chosen at random and has no connection to the Pied Piper folk tale. Since Detroit is their hometown, they have said that the city is very important to them.

Triple P
Their debut album Triple P was released in 2005 on Ubiquity Records and received a large amount of praise from people such as Gilles Peterson, and Questlove, who claimed to have listened to the album seven times in a row.  LA Weekly made it their "Pick of the Week" and said "While [Waajeed] made hip-hop for the streets with his act Slum Village, he's now making intergalactic soul with PPP... the Triple P's debut for Ubiquity has created a buzz in the air and a tremble on the dance floor".

Other album highlights include a Latin-fueled version of “50 Ways to Leave Your Lover” featuring Rogiérs of Fibby Music, and a track with Detroit rapper Invincible.

Their newest album Abundance was released January 20, 2009.  Wajeed stated: "...our tastes have changed—times have changed. It’s definitely a different record, but there are still a lot of similarities."

Discography

Albums 
 Triple P - (2005, Ubiquity)
 Abundance - (2009, Ubiquity)

12"s 
 "Ridin' High" b/w "Open Your Eyes" - (2003, Ubiquity Records)
featuring Dwele
 "Stay With Me"*, "I Got You"*, "Your Day Is Done"^ - (2004, Ubiquity Records)
 featuring Tiombe Lockhart
 featuring Georgia Anne Muldrow
 "Act Like You Know"* b/w "Now Or Never"^ - (2005, Ubiquity Records)
 featuring J Dilla
 featuring Tiombe Lockhart
 "Shotgun", "Fever" (2005, Ubiquity Records)
 featuring Jay Dee (J Dilla), Invincible & Medaphoar

References

External links 
Ubiquity Records
PPP article February 2009
BBC article
Higher ground article
Okay Player article

J Dilla
American hip hop record producers
Detroit hip hop groups
Midwest hip hop groups
Musical groups established in 2000
Ubiquity Records artists
2000 establishments in Michigan